A Maverick Heart Between Love And Life is a  2013 novel written by Ravindra Shukla. Ravindra Shukla is a graduate of IIT-Bombay. The book is based on the real life events; and what happened at the IIT campus while he was studying, what happened in the US corporate world (both Wall Street and Silicon Valley) and what's happening now in India, the current social-political revolution led by the youth.

A Maverick Heart is a free-flowing, easy-to-read story with no literary pretensions.

The book was launched at Press Club Mumbai on 18 Feb 2013 by Mr. Raj Nair founder of Avalon Consulting. This is his first book.

Plot 
Book is inspired by the actual events from the last decade (mostly what happened between 1996 and 2006) across India and USA. It covers the journey of three youth - their peak vibrant period between 18 years and 26 years.

The story revolves around the lives of three friends in IIT, one girl and two guys. The book goes through the ups and downs in their lives, their college life, their personal lives, their professional lives.  Depiction of love relation and friendship during academic life is very meaningful and realistic. In corporate and professional section – plot covers the glamour and up/down of Wall Street. Difference in Silicon Valley entrepreneur’s passionate interest vs glamour and manipulation of Wall Street has been described beautifully.  Finally journey takes you to the current social struggles people facing in country and their transition to political level.

We can relate to protagonist a lot who in one line is "a brilliant mind who chooses to follow his heart". The best part of the book are the discussion (long but don't feel long) between characters which stimulate your mind and heart at the same time, a great mix of philosophy and logic in these discussions. Language is very simple, which makes it a very easy read as well.

Characters 
Richita – She is combination of beauty and brains. She comes from an upper middle class. Her father, Dr. Deen Dayal, is a professor in Lucknow University and is in very powerful position in state politics. He is very protective of Richita. Mother plays a key role in shaping Richita character. Richita – a smart and beautiful girl – tries to follow family and society norms till the end when she cannot ignore her own consent.

Rahul – Son of an Air-force fighter pilot officer, who lost his life in Kashmir in 1990 when Rahul was still in school. Very sharp but highly emotional character, he goes with what his heart and believes in instant action (Genius in mind, socialist by heart, rebel against anything wrong in society). Although miles away from glamour and charm of any girl, he could not resist Richita beauty and attitude. Their relation attaches new meaning to eternal love.

Neerav – Comes from a wealthy businessman family. He knows what is right/wrong but flows with current flow in life. He follows predefined path, focuses on career and success. He is capitalist in belief. Rahul is his best friend. Neerav enjoys life to full extent, is not an emotional character but knows where real talent lies in society and corporate world.

References 

2013 Indian novels